Accentology involves a systematic analysis of word or phrase stress. Sub-areas of accentology include Germanic accentology, Balto-Slavic accentology, Indo-European accentology, and Japanese accentology.

See also
Proto-Slavic accent

References

Prosody (linguistics)
Phonology